Chief Kineubenae (also recorded as Golden Eagle, Quinipeno, Quenebenaw, etc.) (fl. 1797–1812), was a principal chief of the Mississauga Ojibwa, located on the north shore of Lake Ontario.  His name Giniw-bine in the Anishinaabe language means "golden eagle[-like partridge]".  He was a member of the Nigig-doodem (Otter Clan).

Biography
Born in the mid-18th century, Kineubenae grew up in the last decades of Ojibwa domination of present-day southern Ontario, before the American Revolution. Two generations earlier, his ancestors had swept southward from the Mississagi River of the Georgian Bay and by 1700 had expelled the Iroquois. For the next 75 years, Mississaugas alone would occupy the north shore of Lake Ontario.

Due to the American Revolution, thousands of white and Iroquois refugees arrived in southern Ontario. Suddenly the Mississaugas were obliged to cede their territory at the western end of the lake in order to provide land for the newcomers. Retaining for themselves the "Mississauga Tract," an area lying between Burlington Bay (Hamilton Harbour) and the Credit River, they agreed in 1784 to the surrenders on the understanding, in Kineubenae’s later words, that "the Farmers would help us," and that the Indians could "encamp and fish where we pleased." However, the promises were not kept. Instead of assisting the Indians, the farmers "drove [them] off and [shot their] dogs and never give [them] any assistance as was promised to [their] old Chiefs."

Meanwhile, the Mississaugas were suffering from a high mortality rate; close contact with Europeans had brought diseases such as smallpox and tuberculosis, against which they had no natural immunity. Over the period from 1787 to 1798, the population of Mississaugas at the western end of Lake Ontario declined from more than 500 to approximately 350.

As the principal chief of the Mississaugas on Twelve Mile (Bronte) Creek, Kineubenae frequently spoke for the Mississaugas in the early 19th century. In 1805, for example, he negotiated with the British over the proposed sale of the "Mississauga Tract." The surviving minutes of the conference reveal that Kineubenae was a shrewd bargainer. On the first day, he firmly opposed the surrender of more land, for, as he told William Claus, deputy superintendent general of Indian affairs in Upper Canada, "the young Men & Women have found fault with so much having been sold before: it is true we are poor, & the Women say we will be worse, if we part with any more." Only after the British applied pressure on the second day did he comply. Then, in return for ceding the entire lakefront of the tract (the Indians retained the interior section until 1818), Kineubenae extracted a promise from the British that the Mississaugas would keep the river mouths and their rights to the fisheries there.

Within a year, however, Kineubenae was protesting against the settlers’ encroachments on the fisheries. In 1806, he complained about the white man who had taken over his cornfield at Bronte Creek and then destroyed it, as well as that of a poor Indian widow who had four children to support. The same white settler, Kineubenae reported, was building a weir to catch salmon on their way upstream to spawn. In addition, a white squatter at the Credit River had so disturbed the waters "by washing with sope and other dirt, that the fish refuse coming into the River as usual, by which our families are in great distress for want of food."

Death
By 1812, Kineubenae was becoming extremely weak and by his own admission "getting too old to walk." For nearly two decades he had led his people and during this time most of their lands had been taken, the fish and game populations had declined drastically, and their own numbers had been severely reduced. Then, the war between the British and the Americans had extended to the north shore of Lake Ontario. It was at this point that Kineubenae, in order to inspire his band with an example of the strength of their traditions, fasted and obtained "warrior’s medicine."

A group of Mississaugas gathered by a river mouth at the western end of Lake Ontario. As the warriors squatted around him the old chief, Kineubenae, slowly began to tell of the fast in which, through the grace of unseen spirit powers, he had obtained protection against arrows, tomahawks, and even bullets. To demonstrate this gift, he took a tin kettle and, with some difficulty on account of his age, walked a short distance away from the circle. As soon as he raised the kettle up before his face a warrior was to fire, and Kineubenae would collect the bullet in the kettle. The marksman, like the others, believed in Kineubenae’s "medicine" and he fired. The chief instantly fell.

The band, to their horror, found that "the lead went into his head and [had] killed him on the spot." That one bullet did more than kill a respected leader; it shook the faith of many Mississaugas in their traditional way of life. Kineubenae's death, decades later, would facilitate the work of Peter Jones in converting the demoralized Mississaugas to Christianity.

External links
Dictionary of Canadian Biography Online: Kineubenae
Deeds/Nations: Quenepenon

Ojibwe people
18th-century births
1812 deaths
Deaths by firearm in Ontario
Indigenous leaders in Ontario